Bignami may refer to:

Amico Bignami (1862–1929), Italian physician and pathologist
Giovanni Bignami (1944–2017), Italian physicist
Otello Bignami
Osvaldo Bignami (1856–1936), Italian painter
Marchiafava–Bignami disease, neurological disease
Vespasiano Bignami, scapigliatura painter, cartoonist, and writer of 19th century Milan